Olympos Xylofagou is a Cypriot football club from the town of Xylofagou near Larnaca. Club's official name is Αθλητικό Σωματείο Όλυμπος Ξυλοφάγου. The club was founded in 1952 and he's playing in the Cypriot Fourth Division.

Stadium
Currently, the team plays at the 2000 capacity Makario Stadium Xylophagou.

League participations
Cypriot Second Division: 2007–08 
Cypriot Third Division: 2008–

References

External links
Welt

Football clubs in Cyprus
Association football clubs established in 1952